Club Deportivo Santa Amalia is a Spanish football team based in Santa Amalia, in the autonomous community of Extremadura. Founded in 1969, they play in Primera División Extremeña – Group 3, holding home games at Estadio Municipal.

Season to season

22 seasons in Tercera División

External links
Futbolme team profile 

Football clubs in Extremadura
Association football clubs established in 1969
1969 establishments in Spain
Province of Badajoz